is a former Japanese football player.

Playing career
Isoyama was born in Shimotsuma on January 8, 1975. After graduating from Rissho University, he joined the Japan Football League (JFL) club Brummell Sendai in 1997. However, he did not play much. In August 1997, he moved to the JFL club Otsuka Pharmaceutical. He became a regular player as a forward and scored many goals. In 1999, he moved to the newly promoted J2 League club Omiya Ardija. He played often as a regular player. However, he did not play as much in 2001. In July 2002, he moved to the J1 League club Consadole Sapporo on loan. However he did not play much there, either. In 2003, he returned to Omiya Ardija. In 2004, he moved to the J2 club Mito HollyHock. He played often over two seasons. In 2006, he moved to the Japan Football League club Arte Takasaki. He retired at the end of the 2007 season.

Club statistics

References

External links

1975 births
Living people
Rissho University alumni
Association football people from Ibaraki Prefecture
Japanese footballers
J1 League players
J2 League players
Japan Football League (1992–1998) players
Japan Football League players
Vegalta Sendai players
Tokushima Vortis players
Omiya Ardija players
Hokkaido Consadole Sapporo players
Mito HollyHock players
Arte Takasaki players
Association football forwards